Currentweek is an English-language online news magazine in India. The magazine provides information on various topics like technology, health, current affairs, sports, environment, space, politics etc.

References

2008 establishments in India
English-language magazines published in India
News magazines published in India
Online magazines published in India
Magazines established in 2008
Mass media in Hyderabad, India
Defunct magazines published in India
Magazines with year of disestablishment missing